Elena Georgieva (15 March 1930 – 10 January 2007) was a Bulgarian linguist whose work on Bulgarian syntax revolutionized the way that the Bulgarian language was studied by proposing that the word order was determined by the functional perspective of the subject and its theme.

Career
Elena Traycheva Georgieva was a student of Lyubomir Andreychin and spent her career working for the Institute for Bulgarian Language under the Bulgarian Academy of Sciences. She was the first administrative specialist assigned to the institute upon its creation. Georgieva taught at several universities, including Plovdiv University "Paisii Hilendarski" and Shumen University and lectured on the Bulgarian language in France. Georgieva's research covered a broad spectrum of modern Bulgarian language, touching on grammar, history, morphology and syntax, and she was a prolific writer of both analysis and textbooks.

In 1974, she published Simple word order in sentences in Bulgarian literary language, which had a profound impact on linguistic studies. It was not the first study of Bulgarian syntax, but it was the first study to show that word order depended not only on the subject matter but also on the intent of the message being conveyed. Instead of routinely conveying words in the format of subject, verb, object, they might be presented in another format to convey emphasis.

Georgieva was a long-time contributor to the journal Bulgarian Language and Literature. In addition to her own publishing, she served as both an editor and one of the writers on the most important three-volume academic publication on grammar of the Bulgarian language, Grammar of contemporary Bulgarian literary language, as well as the History of Modern Literary Language and a dictionary. She hosted a radio show, "Native Speech" for the Bulgarian National Radio.

Selected works

References

Citations

Bibliography
 
 
 

1930 births
2007 deaths
Writers from Sofia
Linguists from Bulgaria
Women linguists
20th-century Bulgarian scientists
20th-century Bulgarian writers
20th-century women writers
20th-century women scientists
20th-century linguists